A Jodhpuri suit  or Bandhgala (lit. closed neck) suit, is a formal suit from India. It originated in the Jodhpur State, and was popularized during mid 19th - mid 20th century in India. It consists of a coat and trousers, sometimes accompanied by a vest. It brings together a shorter cut with hand-embroidery escorted  by the waistcoat. It is suitable for occasions such as weddings and formal gatherings.

The material can be silk or any other suiting material. Normally, the material is lined at the collar and at the buttons with embroidery. This can be plain, jacquard or jamewari material. Normally, the trousers match that of the coat. There is also a trend to wear contrasting trousers to match the coat colour.

History
Angarkha is considered the predecessor of the Bandhgala. An angrakha was a traditional court outfit in ancient and classical India that a person could wrap comfortably around himself, offering flexible ease with the knots and ties. Bandhgala emerged as a shortened version of the Achkan. Bandhgala quickly became a popular formal and semi-formal uniform across Rajasthan and eventually throughout India. Designer Wendell Rodricks observes that formal wear such as the Bandhgala are evolutions of a costume legacy that is 6,000 years old. Although, unlike the indigenous european style men's skirts, eastern style pants are worn with it.

See also
 Nehru jacket

References

Rajasthani clothing
Jodhpur
Indian clothing
Folk costumes
Jackets
Suits (clothing)